The 2021–22 season is Greenock Morton's seventh consecutive season in the Scottish Championship, following their promotion from Scottish League One in the 2014–15 season. They will also compete in the Scottish League Cup, Scottish Challenge Cup and the Scottish Cup.

Season summary
In May 2021, the SPFL confirmed the return of the Scottish Challenge Cup after being scrapped for the 2020–21 season however, teams from Wales, Northern Ireland and the Republic of Ireland would not be included to reduce unnecessary travel during the COVID-19 pandemic.

Management
Morton began the season under the management of Gus MacPherson who had been appointed midway through the previous season and had overseen their survival in the Scottish Championship. On 4 December, MacPherson was sacked from his position with the club sitting eighth in the table, ahead of the relegation play-off spot on goal difference. On 21 December, former Morton winger Dougie Imrie returned to the club and was appointed as their new manager.

Competitions

Scottish Championship

Scottish League Cup

Group stage

Notes

Scottish Challenge Cup

Scottish Cup

Team Statistics

League table

League Cup table

References

Greenock Morton
Greenock Morton F.C. seasons